Lopaš may refer to:

 Lopaš (Požega), a village in Serbia
 Lopaš (Trstenik), a village in Serbia